= Steel Wolf =

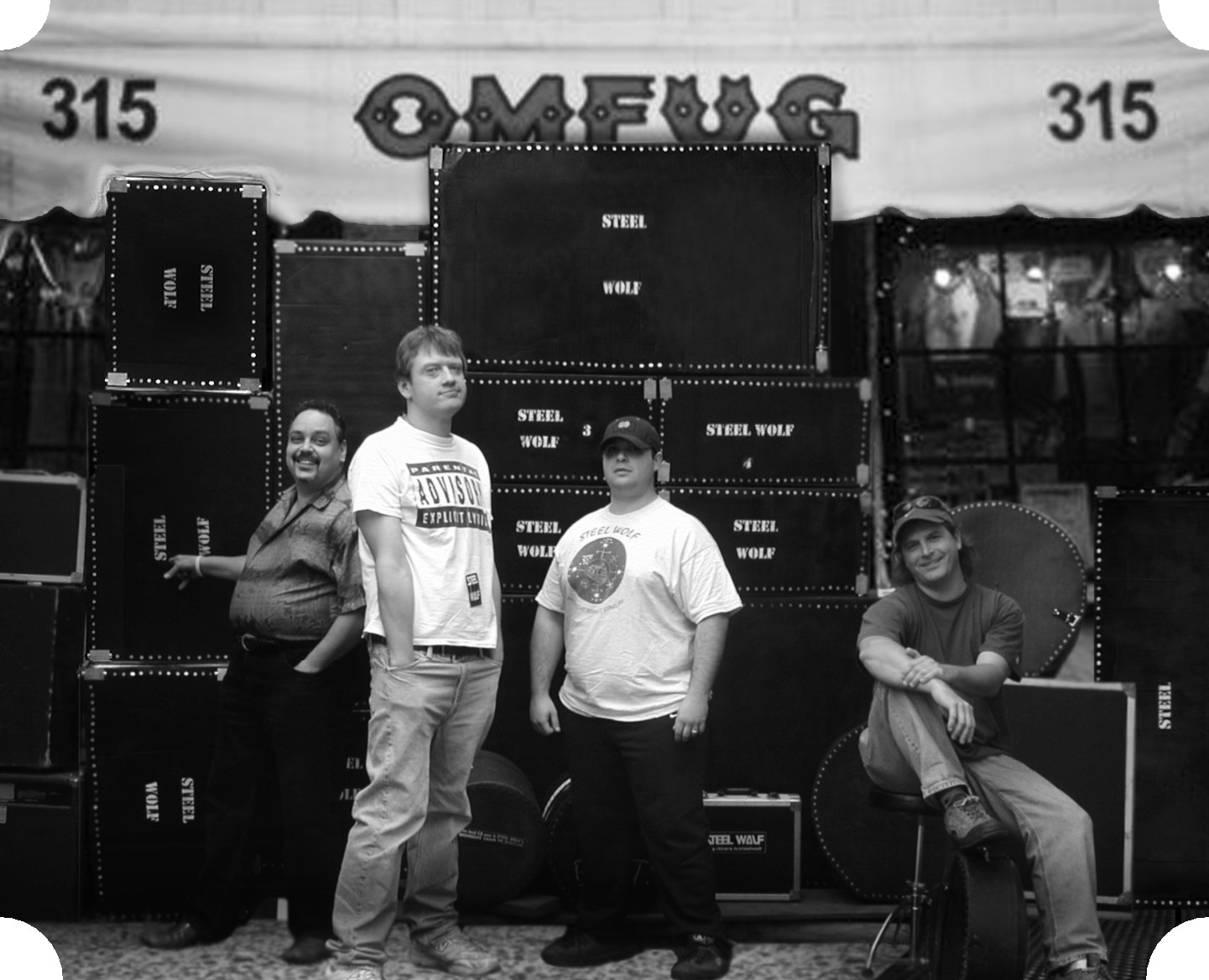
- Steel Wolf circa 2006

Background information
- Origin: Long Island, New York
- Genres: Rock
- Years active: 1982–present
- Members: Mark Vytas Adomaitis; Edvardas Kezys
- Past members: Algis Kezys; Clark Adomaitis; Algirdas Bivainis; Michael Jaillon; Rimas Kezys; Vytis Kezys; Andrius Lileika; Paul Naronis; Ellis Spanos (R.I.P.); Gregory Szlezak
- Website: www.steelwolfband.com

Steel Wolf are Lithuanian-American recording artists from Long Island, New York. Described as playing “music to incite a riot”, Steel Wolf took their name from Lithuanian folklore in 1982 and is still active today. Aside from archetypal venues, they have performed annually at the NYC Marathon and the north east Lithuanian camp, Giraite. Their releases not only contain music with “bar brawl-ready song titles” but also tracks like “Himnas 2010” - a version of the Lithuanian National Anthem. As Long Island Good Times magazine put it "Steel Wolf blends punk anachronisms with Lithuanian mythology.”

== Discography ==
=== Studio recordings ===
- Eternal Damnation (Lounge Music, 1986)
- Backyards of Bushwick (Lounge Music, 1986)
- Rock ‘n’ Roll Rehab (Lounge Music, 1987)
- Boozer Friendly (Rectal Records, 1998)
- Midnight Train To Siauliai (Lounge Music, 2003, re-released 2014)
- Embracing Mainstream Success (Lounge Music, 2009)
- Variety Pack (Lounge Music, 2013)
- Hot Honey Liquor (Lounge Music, 2015)
- The Unreleased Album (Lounge Music, 2017)
- Not Playin' With A Full Deck (Lounge Music, 2019)
- Funplugged (Lounge Music, 2021)

=== Singles ===
- Kur Tas Kugelis? (Lounge Music, 2015)
- Trip To Europe (Lounge Music, 2019)
- Better Than The Beetles (Lounge Music, 2019)
- Smokin' Crack Blues (R 'n' B) (Lounge Music, 2019)
- I'm Right, You're Wrong (End Of Story) (Lounge Music, 2019)
- Skambutis! (Lounge Music, 2019)
- If I Was Me (Lounge Music, 2019)
- Rock Ir Roll (Lounge Music, 2019)
- Wiggle Room (Lounge Music, 2019)
- Please Hold My Nuts (Lounge Music, 2019)
- A Royal Flush (Lounge Music, 2019)
- Skambutis! (Kalėdinė versija) (Lounge Music, 2019)

=== EPs ===
- Steel Wolf is Exploring Uranus (Lounge Music, 1998)
- Super Sounds of the 70s (Lounge Music, 2017)

=== Live recordings ===
- Loungin’ Live! (Lounge Music, 1986)
- The Rise and Fall of Steel Wolf (Lounge Music, 1995)
- Loungin’ Live, Too! (Lounge Music, 2000)
- Night of 2000 Koldunai (Lounge Music, 2001)
- Loungin’ Live Forever! [Fan Club Only] (Lounge Music, 2005)
- Nakturnal Wood (Lounge Music, 2013)
- The Spotlight Tapes (Lounge Music, 2016)
- Loungin' Live 2017 (Lounge Music, 2017
- Loungin' Live Now! (Lounge Music, 2020)

=== Compilations ===
- Greatest Hits (Lounge Music, 1987)
- After Twenty Beers! (Lounge Music, 2002)
- The Complete Breakfasts (Lounge Music, 2006)
- Aural Kugelis - A Virtual Greatest Hits (Lounge Music, 2016)

=== Videos ===
- Rhythm ‘n’ Booze (JFK Productions, 2001)
- Camp Giraite 2 - Guitars, Grub & Grog (Lounge Music, 2012)

=== Andrius Lileika solo ===
- Return from Oblivion (LaNaked, 1987)
- Take Two (LaNaked, 1988)
- From Alchemy to Alice's (Lounge Music, 2009)
