= Embracing Mainstream Success =

Studio album by Steel Wolf
- Released: 2009
- Genre: Heavy metal
- Length: 46:27
- Label: Lounge Music

Steel Wolf chronology
Midnight Train To Siauliai (2003)	Embracing Mainstream Success (2009)	Variety Pack (2013)

Embracing Mainstream Success is the sixth studio album by the Lithuanian-American heavy metal band Steel Wolf. It was released in 2009.

== Track listing ==
1. "Shoplifting Bananas" – 3:36
2. "Himnas 2010" - 1:51
3. "No Mercy Flush" – 4:30
4. "My Grandma’s Advice" – 3:21
5. "Serving Beer To Miners" – 3:15
6. "Hazardville Headlines" – 4:59
7. "Terry’s Tasty Taco" – 3:15
8. "Gettin’ It (From Both Ends)" – 4:10
9. "Stinkfinger!" - 3:40
10. "Depends On Me" - 3:34
11. "I Want A 20-Piece" - 3:40
12. "Spread The Love Mayonnaise" - 5:42

== Critical reception ==
Although the group is proud of its Lithuanian heritage, it is obvious by [their] song titles that it still finds time to pile on the laughs in a saucy manner [and] straddle the fence between the riff-heavy sounds of 70's British hard rockers and the raw urgency from punk rock days of yore.

== Credits ==
- Mark Vytas Adomaitis-Lead vocals, Percussion
- Algis Kezys-Drums, Vocals
- Paul Naronis-Guitar
- Greg Szlezak-Bass / Ellis Spanos-Bass
